This is a list of OECD nations, and their health expenditure by type of financing.

Public health expenditure consists of recurrent and capital spending from government (central and local) budgets, external borrowings and grants (including donations from international agencies and nongovernmental organizations), and social (or compulsory) health insurance funds. Total health expenditure is the sum of public and private health expenditure. It covers the provision of health services (preventive and curative), family planning activities, nutrition activities, and emergency aid designated for health but does not include provision of water and sanitation.

2017 OECD member health expenditure by type of financing 

Table is initially in descending order by the percentage of health expenditure paid by the government. OECD36 average is for the 36 OECD nations at the time this data was compiled at the source.

Notes for superscript numbers next to country names:
1. All spending by private health insurance companies in the United States is reported under compulsory health insurance.
2. Health payment schemes unable to be disaggregated into voluntary health insurance, NPISH and enterprise financing are reported under other.
3. Voluntary payment schemes unable to be disaggregated are reported under voluntary health insurance.

See also

List of countries by hospital beds
List of countries by life expectancy
List of countries by total health expenditure per capita

References

Expenditure
International quality of life rankings